Cham Palak (also Romanized as Cham Palk) is a village in Kashkan Rural District, Shahivand District, Dowreh County, Lorestan Province, Iran. At the 2006 census, its population was 575, in 117 families.

References 

Towns and villages in Dowreh County